Roik is a surname. Notable people with the surname include:
Matt Roik (born 1979), Canadian lacrosse player
Vera Roik (1911–2010), Ukrainian embroiderer